Sandy Island is a small island in Northern Saskatchewan, Canada; surrounded by Hatchet Lake.  The island contains the main site for the Hatchet Lake Lodge (established in 1963).  The island is treed, with a small and large sandy beach.

The Island is accessed by the Hatchet Lake Airport and Hatchet Lake Water Aerodrome both owned by the Hatchet Lake Lodge.

References

Lake islands of Saskatchewan